Joel Bruce King (born 30 October 2000) is an Australian professional soccer player who plays as a left back for OB.

Club career

Sydney FC
King made his professional debut for Sydney FC in a Round 27 clash against Newcastle Jets, playing the full game in a 2–0 loss at McDonald Jones Stadium. On 9 May 2019, he signed his first professional contract with the club, penning a one-year deal for the 2019–2020 season. King cemented his spot in the Sydney team, and started in every game for Sydney during the 2020-21 season with regular fullback Michael Zullo missing the majority of the season with a recurring calf injury. His consistent performances during the season resulted in him winning the 2020-21 Young Footballer of the year award at the end of season awards, becoming the first Sydney FC player to do so.

Odense Boldklub
On 29 January 2022, it was announced that King had signed with Danish club OB after triggering a six figure release clause.

Loan to Sydney FC
In February 2023, King was loaned back to former club Sydney FC until the end of the 2022–23 A-League Men season.

International career

Australian under-23s
King was called up to the Australian under-23 squad for the delayed 2020 Tokyo Olympics by manager Graham Arnold. He made his debut in a friendly warm up game for the Olympics against New Zealand in a 0–2 loss. 
 
King provided an assist for Australia's first goal of the tournament, scored by Lachlan Wales against Argentina in which Australia ran out 2-0 winners.

Career statistics

Honours

Club
Sydney FC
 A-League Championship: 2019–20
 A-League Premiership: 2019–20

International
Australia U17
AFF U-16 Youth Championship: 2016

Individual
Sydney FC
 A-League Young Footballer of the Year: 2020–21

References

External links

2000 births
Living people
Australian soccer players
Association football defenders
Sydney FC players
Odense Boldklub players
A-League Men players
National Premier Leagues players
Danish Superliga players
Footballers at the 2020 Summer Olympics
Olympic soccer players of Australia
Australian expatriate soccer players
Expatriate men's footballers in Denmark
2022 FIFA World Cup players